Chrysophyllum aulacocarpum is a tree in the family Sapotaceae, native to Venezuela.

Distribution and habitat
Chrysophyllum aulacocarpum is endemic to Venezuela, where it is considered to be confined to the area of Los Teques in Miranda state.

Conservation
Chrysophyllum aulacocarpum has been assessed as Critically Endangered (possibly extinct) on the IUCN Red List. The species is only known from its initial identification in 1874. Given that its habitat of that time is now in the urban area of Los Teques, it is at best threatened by urban development.

References

aulacocarpum
Endemic flora of Venezuela
Plants described in 1874